The Pseudodon shell DUB1006-fL or Pseudodon DUB1006-fL (540,000-430,000 BP) is a fossil freshwater shell of Pseudodon vondembuschianus trinilensis found at Trinil, Java, Indonesia. The shell has a zigzag engraving supposedly made by Homo erectus, which could be the oldest known anthropogenic engraving in the world.

Description
The shell is a part of an assemblage of fossil freshwater mussel shells, excavated by the Dutch paleoanthropologist and geologist Eugène Dubois in 1890s from the Pleistocene layer at the Trinil site, Java, Indonesia. The assemblage, including the shell DUB1006-fL, is now at the Naturalis Biodiversity Center, Leiden, Netherlands.

Geometric engravings on the shell DUB1006-fL were discovered by a biologist Josephine Joordens (then at Leiden University) and her colleagues in 2014. Their analysis suggests that the engravings are made by Homo erectus between 540,000 and 430,000 BP. The engravings were probably made on a fresh shell specimen using a shark tooth. It is also suggested that all grooves were made by a single individual in a single session with the same tool.

Interpretation
Joordens et al. do not give a direct interpretation of the engravings, but suggest that "engraving abstract patterns was in the realm of Asian Homo erectus cognition and neuromotor control." In her interview, Joordens says that since the intentions of the person who made the engravings are not known, it is not possible to classify these engravings as art. "It could have been to impress his girlfriend, or to doodle a bit, or to mark the shell as his own property," says Joordens.

Controversy
The main discussion happens around the question of whether the engraving on the shell can be considered as art (which would make it the earliest known artistic expression of hominids in the world). Commentators of the original study by Joordens et al. suggest their opinions, but do not study the engravings explicitly. Some commentators, similarly to the authors of the study, give a neutral description of the engravings, calling them a "doodle" or "decorative marks". Some other commentators suggest explicitly that these engravings are art.

Tsion Avital, a philosopher of art and culture, makes a distinction between art and design and suggests that the engraving on Pseudodon DUB1006-fL cannot be seen as the former, but can well be the latter. He contests the description of the engraving by Joordens et al. who called it an "abstract pattern", saying that the terms "abstract" and "pattern" "hint obliquely at the possibility that these engravings possess some symbolic significance." "These engravings are in no sense abstract but rather are completely concrete marks," says Avital.

See also
 Homo erectus
 Java man
 Venus of Tan-Tan
 Venus of Berekhat Ram
 Prehistoric art
 Art of the Middle Paleolithic

References

Archaeology of Indonesia
Archaeological artifacts
Paleolithic
Acheulean
Indonesian art
Prehistoric art
Works of unknown authorship